Jhalakati Sadar (or Jhalokathi Sadar) is an upazila of Jhalokati District in the Division of Barisal, Bangladesh.

Geography 
It has 36,504 households and a total area 204.48 km2.

History
At the start of Mughal rule in the late sixteenth century, a Sufi saint originally from Iran known as Dawud Shah settled in the village of Sugandhia in Jhalkathi. At that time, the sardar of the village was Sraban Thakur. It is said that Dawud Shah took shelter in Sraban Thakur's home by under the guise of a labourer. However, Sraban Thakur later realised Dawud Shah's karamat and both he and his wife converted to Islam and he changed his name to Sraban Khan. A khanqah was then established by Sraban Khan in Sugandhia for Dawud Shah. Dawud Shah was known to have established three mosques. The first was built in Jhalokati port and remained active as late as 1967. The ruins of the mosque lie next to the Jhalokati Tablighi Masjid which was built as a replacement of this ancient mosque being destroyed. Dawud Shah also built two other mosques in Sutalari and Nalchity. The administrator of Gaur heard of Dawud Shah's activities and was very overwhelmed. After Dawud Shah's death, he sent white stones from Rajmahal and Rajasthan to Sugandhia for the building of his mazar (mausoleum). The mazar has the biggest Quranic typography than any mazar in Bangladesh. The Sardar family of Sugandhia continue to serve as the guardians of this mausoleum, and Alamat Khan (son of Sraban Khan) and Niamat Khan were buried next to Dawud Shah after their deaths. The emperor awarded them tax-free land as Cheragi Dawud Shah under Qismat Charamaddi in the Chandradwip pargana. The administrative division of Qismat Charamaddi (Char Ahmadi) was named after Alamat Khan's son Ahmad Khan.  The guardianship was later transferred to the Khandaker family of Sugandhia during British rule.

During the seventeenth century, a Muslim missionary descended from Abu Bakr named Sheikh Shah Khudgir settled in the village of Rajpasha after spending some time in Faridpur where he built the Patbail and Paitledi mosques. He died in Rajpasha and his mazar (mausoleum) and adjacent pond became an important site in the local area. The nearby Sheikherhat area was named after him and his descendants who are known as the Sheikh family of Rajpasha.

In the same century, Kirtinarayan Basu, the former Raja of Chandradwip, settled in Jhalkathi's Keora village after converting to Islam. He founded the Baklai family of Keora who possessed land in the Chandradwip and Salimabad parganas and particularly, taluqs in Mathbaria and Morrelganj. His son and successor, Mahmud Hasan Taqi, founded a mosque in the village of Keora. Taqi had three sons; Mahmud Ghazanfar Ali, Mahmud Sadeq and Ejaz Mahmud. Mahmud Sadeq's son was Qutb Mahmud, whose son was Jan Mahmud, whose son was Rahmat Ali Baklai, whose son was Mahmud Ali Baklai, whose son was Amud Ali Baklai, whose son was Ahmad Ali Balkai, whose son was Abdul Majid Baklai. In total, Kirtinarayan's descendants number over one thousand today.

Demographics 
According to the 1991 Bangladesh census, Jhalakati Sadar had a population of 195,619. Males comprised 51.13% of the population, and females 48.87%. The population aged 18 or over was 102,890. Jhalakati Sadar had an average literacy rate of 54.4% (7+ years), compared to the national average of 32.4%.

Economy
Between 1940 and 1975, Jhalakati was famous for the only automatic rice huller in the region owned by Shudhangshu Bhushan Das (Son of Aswini Kumar Das) and his two friends (Sons of former National Assembly Member Hazi Ghani Khan). It was a thriving complex built on an area approximately 2 square kilometer. The smoke from the chimney served as a navigation landmark by passing steamers while the factory siren could be heard from as far as Barisal. After the company declared bankruptcy shortly after the war. Shudhangshu descendants eventually migrated to India and other parts of Bangladesh while his partners had stayed back to establish their own ventures. The massive ruins of the factory can still be seen in the west Chandkati. The Das family lost its honour, assets and property due to the partition of India and Pakistan leading to a dangerous military rule in east Pakistan (present-day Bangladesh) which initiated riots killing and displacing millions of Hindu Bengalis from their homes to seek refuge in India. Shudhangshu who inspired the name Shugandha River and industrial venture Shugandha that was founded by his two close friends shortly after the liberation war. Ghani Khan's descendants now control the economy of the entire district till date. The District that once popular due to the existence of six aristocrat families (Das, Khan, Roy, Sardar, Mira, Chakrabortty) and their businesses, have now forgotten most of their contributions.

Administration
Jhalakati Sadar Upazila is divided into Jhalakati Municipality and 10 union parishads: Basanda, Binoykati, Gabkhandhansiri, Gabharamchandrapur, Keora, Kirtipasha, Nabagram, Nathullabad, Ponabalia, and Sekherhat. The union parishads are subdivided into 158 mauzas and 190 villages.

Jhalakati Municipality is subdivided into 9 wards and 47 mahallas.

Education

There are six colleges in the upazila. They include Aklima Moazzem Hossain College, Hemayet Uddin Degree College, Jhalakathi Government College, founded in 1964, Jhalakathi Government Women's College, Shah Mahmudia College, and Sher-E-Bangla Fazlul Haque College.

According to Banglapedia, Bowkathi Bindu Bashini High School, founded 1918, Jhalokati Government Girls' School (1919), Jhalakathi Government High School (1872), Kirtipasa Prosanna Kumar Secondary School (1903),  
Nathullabad High School (1923), Udbodhan Secondary School (1940) and Taruli Secondary School (1957) are notable secondary schools.

The madrasa education system includes three fazil and one kamil madrasas. According to Banglapedia, Sarengal Nesaria Honainia Fazil Madrasa, founded in 1974, is a notable Fazil madrasa.

Notable residents
 Amir Hossain Amu, Minister of Industries, has been the Member of Parliament for constituency Jhalokati-2 since 2009.
 A. K. Fazlul Huq, Prime Minister of Bengal (1937–1943) and Governor of East Pakistan (1956–1958), was born at Saturia in 1873.
 Golam Mustafa, actor 
 Kamini Roy, poet and social worker, was born at Basanda village in 1864.
 Kirtinarayan Basu, Raja of Chandradwip who resettled in Jhalakathi after converting to Islam

See also 
Upazilas of Bangladesh
Districts of Bangladesh
Divisions of Bangladesh

References 

Upazilas of Jhalokati District